King Ratsadanay (1874-1945) was the last king of Champasak. He was the father of Boun Oum.

His Royal Highness Prince Yutidhatthorn (Yui Na Champasak) was born in 1874 [1] as the eldest son of His Royal Highness Prince Yumkhamom Yutidhatthorn Nakorn Champasak Raksa Prajatibodi (Kamsuk Na Champasak). The 11th ruler of Champasak received the rank from His Majesty King Chulalongkorn (Rama V) to be the royal palace The position of Assistant to the Governor of Champasak in 1897 [2] Incidentally, this position of Chao Rajadanai was graciously bestowed upon the son of the Governor of the country. which is inferior to the rank of His Royal Highness Prince or Prince But it was not included in the Fourth Penal regime, which was Lao's traditional regime.

Later, when Chao Justice Thon ( Kamsuk Na Champasak) Piranai with an old disease in the year 2444 B.E. (Chao Khamphan) was the governor of the city of Champasak while because it was not yet time for His Majesty the King To appoint the new ruler of Champasak [3] Later in the year 2446, the territory of Champasak City fell into the rule of France according to the treaty dated 13 February R.E. 122 France then persuaded Chao Rachadanai (Yui) to be the ruler of Champasak City, succeeding his father. He therefore has a secret book to consult. Somdet Krom Phraya Damrong Rajanubhab (While having the title of Phra Chao Nong Ya Thee Krom Muen) Chancellor of the Ministry of InteriorAt that time, which Krom Phraya Damrong replied that "Take the position of making France lose. Otherwise, if the French bring other people to set up a royal family, Prince Justice will suffer." Chao Rajadanai (Yui) therefore agreed to accept as the ruler of Champasak since then. On the French side, Chao Rajadanai (Yui) was set up as Chao Yutiditthorn, like the previous Champasak rulers [4] and was considered the ruler of Champasak who received the title of a stationed position. Chao Yutthitthorn was also the 3rd in line of the Champasak dynasty.

Later, the French Indochina government Has canceled the status of the ruler on November 22 , 1904 [1] His Highness Justice Thammarat (Yui) therefore became the governor of Champasak City instead, but still held the dignity of The Champasak dynasty lasted until 1941, when Siam recaptured the land of Champasak City again. and was established as In Champasak Province , the Thai government has retained the honor of His Royal Highness Princess Yuttithorn (Yui) as the ruler of Champasak City as before. In other words, To be the newly established governor He was in this position and dignity until his death in the position on March 2 , 1946.Before the land of Champasak returned to France again not long ago [5]

Laotian royalty
1874 births
1945 deaths
19th-century Laotian people
20th-century Laotian people